Duelle (Une ) is a 1976 experimental fantasy drama directed by Jacques Rivette. The main title is a neologistic feminine form for the noun "duel." The director-assigned English title is Twhylight, a combination of "twilight" and "why". The film stars Juliet Berto as the Queen of the Night who battles the Queen of the Sun (Bulle Ogier) over a magical diamond that will allow the winner to remain on earth, specifically modern-day Paris.

Cast
Juliet Berto as Leni 
Bulle Ogier as Viva 
Jean Babilée as Pierrot 
Hermine Karagheuz as Lucie 
Nicole Garcia as Jeanne / Elsa 
Claire Nadeau as Sylvia Stern 
Elisabeth Wiener as Allié de Viva 
Jean Wiener as Au piano 
André Dauchy as A l'accordéon 
Roger Fugen as A la batterie

References

External links
 

1976 films
1970s fantasy drama films
1970s French-language films
French avant-garde and experimental films
Films directed by Jacques Rivette
French fantasy drama films
1970s avant-garde and experimental films
1976 drama films
1970s French films